Neorhizobium is a genus of Gram-negative soil bacteria that fix nitrogen. It was recently segregated from the genus Rhizobium.  Neorhizobium forms an endosymbiotic nitrogen-fixing association with roots of legumes.

References

Rhizobiaceae
Bacteria genera